James Martin Beglin (born 29 July 1963) is an Irish former professional footballer and current co-commentator for RTÉ, CBS Sports, BT Sport, and Premier League Productions.

Playing career

Shamrock Rovers 
Beglin played schoolboy football in his native city with Bolton and Waterford Bohs before joining Shamrock Rovers in 1980. He went on to spend three years at Milltown, making four appearances in Europe and scoring one goal.

In 1982 Beglin was part of the League of Ireland XI that toured New Zealand where they played the New Zealand national football team.

Liverpool 
He was gradually brought into the first team over the next 18 months by Joe Fagan, before being given regular games in the left back slot by new player-manager Kenny Dalglish as a replacement for Alan Kennedy in the 1985–86 season. He made his debut in the left sided midfield position on 10 November 1984 in the 1–1 league draw with Southampton at Anfield. He scored his first goal for the club 5 months later on 10 April 1985 in the 4–0 European Cup Semi-final first leg victory over Greek side Panathinaikos at Anfield. Beglin's 85th-minute strike put the tie out of reach for the Greek club. Liverpool won the second leg 1–0 to set up a showdown in the final with Italian giants Juventus at the Heysel Stadium in Belgium however a retaining wall collapsed during a riot at the "neutral" end, and 39 Juventus supporters died, in what came to be known as the Heysel Stadium Disaster. Liverpool also lost the final.

Liverpool won the League championship and FA Cup, pipping Merseyside rivals Everton to both, with Beglin picking up medals for each. He also began playing for the Republic of Ireland, picking up the first of 15 caps.

Seven months after lifting the league and cup double, his leg was badly broken following a mistimed tackle from Everton's Gary Stevens in the League Cup fifth round game in January 1987. Former manager Bob Paisley said that it was one of the worst leg breaks he had ever seen, joking that he would break his own leg to prove a point to the FA. Furthermore, Liverpool defender Alan Hansen stated that the tackle was "a mile high and an hour late". Recovering from the break, Beglin sustained a knee cartilage injury playing for Liverpool's reserves in October 1988 which effectively finished his time at Anfield.

Leeds United 
In June 1989, he joined Leeds United, where he helped the club to become Second Division champions and spent periods on loan with both Plymouth Argyle and Blackburn Rovers before a recurrence of his knee injury forced him into an early retirement in 1991, when still only 27.

International career 
He also began playing for the Republic of Ireland, picking up 15 caps.

Media career 
Beglin is a co-commentator for BT Sport, Premier League Productions, and CBS Sports, and was a co-commentator on ITV and a sports journalist on Granada Television. He commentated for RTÉ in the 2014 FIFA World Cup and 2018 Fifa World Cup. In the past for RTÉ he has worked on coverage of Premier League, UEFA Champions League matches and Republic of Ireland internationals. Beglin has also been employed by Liverpool as a voice–over artist for the club's official DVD and video releases. He has also been the co-commentator in the Pro Evolution Soccer video game series since Pro Evolution Soccer 2011, alongside Jon Champion and later Peter Drury.  On 4 May 2021, during a live broadcast of a champions league semi-final, Beglin attributed Di Maria's red card to his "Latino temperament", for which he later apologized. On 15 January 2022, during a live broadcast of a Premier League match, Beglin called the Etihad Stadium the 'Emptihad', but later he has issued an apology to the Manchester City fanbase.

Honours
Liverpool
Football League First Division: 1985–86  
FA Cup: 1985–86
FA Charity Shield: 1986

Leeds United
Football League Second Division: 1989–90

References

External links
 Official past players at Liverpoolfc.tv
 Player profile at LFChistory.net
 Biography at sporting–heroes.net

1963 births
Living people
Sportspeople from Waterford (city)
Association footballers from County Waterford
Republic of Ireland association footballers
Republic of Ireland international footballers
Republic of Ireland B international footballers
Republic of Ireland under-21 international footballers
Shamrock Rovers F.C. players
Liverpool F.C. players
Leeds United F.C. players
Plymouth Argyle F.C. players
Blackburn Rovers F.C. players
League of Ireland players
League of Ireland XI players
English Football League players
Association football fullbacks
FA Cup Final players